Samuel Snowden (1850) was an African-American abolitionist and pastor of the May Street Church, one of the first black Methodist churches in Boston, Massachusetts. Under Reverend Snowden's direction from 1818 to 1850, the May Street Church congregation supported the Underground Railroad; members included several prominent abolitionists, such as David Walker from North Carolina. Snowden was born into slavery in the South, but later reached the North and began his career as a pastor.

Pastoral life 
Prior to 1818, Reverend Snowden served as the pastor of the Chestnut Street Church in Portland, Maine. As the African-American community in the Bromfield Street Methodist Episcopal Church in Boston grew, they petitioned their bishop to establish a separate black Methodist church and to appoint Reverend Snowden as their pastor. While smaller than the prominent First African Baptist Church in Boston, they had a kind of independence.

The bishop accepted their petition, and in 1818 he appointed Reverend Snowden as pastor of the newly established May Street Church.  With Reverend Snowden at the helm, the May Street Church community grew too large for their facilities, and they built a new church nearby in 1824, the Revere Street Church. Snowden served as pastor until his death in 1850.

Abolitionist activities 
While pastor of the May Street and Revere Street churches, Reverend Snowden was deeply involved in the antislavery movement. David Walker, leading abolitionist and author of An Appeal to the Coloured Citizens of the World, was a member of the May Street Church. Snowden's "powerful personality and antislavery activism" is likely what attracted Walker to his church, and the men lived across the street from each other on the north side of Beacon Hill in the late 1820s.

Although his congregation supported the church as a stop on the Underground Railroad, Snowden and his family also aided fugitive slaves at their own homes. Snowden and his daughters, Isabella and Holmes, were known for welcoming fugitive slaves into their houses, offering them shelter, food, and clothing. Additionally, Reverend Snowden worked closely with William Lloyd Garrison, donating money to the cause of abolition and allowing Garrison to use his church's facilities for events.

References 

African-American abolitionists
African-American Methodists
Abolitionists from Boston
1850 deaths
Year of birth uncertain
18th-century American slaves
Fugitive American slaves
Methodist abolitionists
People of colonial Massachusetts
People from colonial Boston